Live at the Classic Center is a live DVD by the band Widespread Panic.  The album and accompanying film were recorded at the Classic Center in the band's hometown of Athens, Georgia on February 10 and February 11, 2011 on the occasion of the band's 25th anniversary.

Track listing

February 10, 2011

Disc One
 For What It's Worth
 Sleepy Monkey
 Chilly Water
 Saint Ex
 One Arm Steve
 Mr. Soul
 You'll Be Fine
 This Cruel Thing
 Holden Oversoul
 Contentment Blues
 Bowlegged Woman

Disc Two
 Pigeons
 Jack
 Proving Ground
 Going Out West
 Arleen
 Drums
 Fire on the Mountain
 Space Wrangler
 Coconuts
 Knocking Round the Zoo
 Greta
 Heaven

February 11, 2011

Disc One
"No Sugar Tonight/New Mother Nature"
"Tall Boy"
"Red Hot Mam"
"Machine"
"Barstools and Dreamers"
"Can't Get High"
"Henry Parsons Died"
"This Part of Town"
"Nights in White Satin"
"Love Tractor"

Disc Two
"Worry"
"Imitation Leather Shoes"
"Blue Indian"
"Blight"
"You Got Yours"
"Impossible"
"New Speedway Boogie"
"Fishwater"
"Conrad"
"Don't Be Denied"
"Postcard"
"Driving Song"
"Porch Song"

Personnel
John Bell
John "JoJo" Hermann
Jimmy Herring
Todd Nance
Domingo S. Ortiz
David Schools
John Keane - Sitting in on pedal steel for "You'll Be Fine" and sitting in on guitar for  "This Cruel Thing"
Anne Richmond Boston - Sitting in on vocals for "You'll Be Fine"
Randall Bramblett - Sitting in on the Sax for "Going Out West", "Arleen", and "Jam"

Widespread Panic video albums
2011 live albums
2011 video albums
Live video albums